"Sundown" is a song by New Zealand band Six60, released as the final single from their third album Six60 in August 2020.

Background and composition

The song's instruments are primarily samples of taonga pūoro (traditional Māori instruments). The samples were taken from an album by Hinewehi Mohi, which the song's producer Malay used as a basis for the track. Six60's lead singer Matiu Walters felt the song was one of his favourite tracks from the band's third album, describing it as "sound[ing] exactly like where we are right now."

Release and promotion 

The song was released as a single in the lead-up to their documentary film Six60: Till the Lights Go Out (2020). A music video was produced for the song, and released on 30 October. The video was directed by Connor Pritchard, who was given full creative control by the band, and shot over three days. At the 2021 Vision Feast Awards, the video won the Best Music Video award, and Pritchard was awarded the Visionary Director and Visionary Editing awards due to his work on the clip.

During the band's 2021 tour, musician and choreographer Pere Wihongi was employed to create a kapa haka routine for "Sundown", which was performed by a different regional kapa haka group at each concert.

Critical reception 

Alex Behan of Stuff described the song as "dreamy and aspirational".

Credits and personnel
Credits adapted from Tidal.

Matt Chamberlain – drums
Ji Fraser – guitar
Chris Galland – mixing engineer
Marlon Gerbes – guitar, keyboards, songwriting
Chris Mac – bass guitar
Malay – engineer, production, songwriting
Manny Marroquin – mixer
Eli Paewai – drums
Paul Phamous – songwriting
Six60 – performer
Matiu Walters – songwriting, vocals

Charts

Year-end charts

Certifications

References

2020 singles
2019 songs
New Zealand pop songs
Six60 songs
Songs written by Malay (record producer)